Nokona Athletic Goods Company is an American manufacturing company of sports equipment and clothing products, specialized in baseball gloves. The company, headquartered in Nocona, Texas, is the last major baseball glove manufacturer in the United States.

Apart from baseball gloves, Nokona recently reintroduced "Nokona Leather Goods," selling leather products such as belts, wallets, bags, backpacks, and footwear (boots, flip-flops); all made in the United States Other products by the company include t-shirts and caps.

History

Origins & Leadership
Established in 1926 as the Nocona Leather Goods company by the Storey family in Nocona, Texas. The company first began selling wallets, purses, and belts. In 1934, The Nokona baseball glove was trademarked (spelled with a "k" when the United States Patent and Trademark Office would not allow the name of an incorporated town to be registered).

Nocona Leather Goods entered the sporting goods industry in 1932, after Robert E. (Bob) Storey took over the operations. Storey had played baseball for Rice University before becoming President of the Nocona Leather Goods Company in the 1930s. With that decision, Nocona introduced their new leather footballs, helmets, and baseball gloves. He held that post until he retired in 1976, and his son Bobby Storey took over the role. Seven years later, his younger son J.W. (Jim) became President of the company, until his sudden death in 1991. Following that tragedy, Rob Storey (son of Bobby and grandson of R.E.) was appointed President of the company. In 2010, Jeff Beraznik became President of Nokona. Rob Storey and continues to serve as the company’s Executive Vice-President. As such, the Storey family maintains an integral role at Nokona.

Major Developments at Nokona
In 1942, Nokona received a government contract to produce gloves for the United States Military during the War. Production soared to 1,000 gloves per day (up from 50 to 100), requiring the factory to expand. Expansions were added to the production facility in 1944 and again in 1947. Nokona entered the golden age of sports after World War II. Starting in 1946, people participated in athletics like never before, with fastpitch softball booming in popularity, as well as amateur baseball. With the increase in popularity, Nokona diversified its baseball and football lines. By the end of the 1940’s, the company also produced volleyballs, soccer balls, basketballs, striking bags, and boxing gloves, all made of leather. The first Nokona ballglove with Kangaroo leather was produced in 1957. Nokona was the first company to use this leather in a baseball glove; continuing it as a popular part of its lineup today. 

During the 1960s, many sports manufacturers moved from the United States to Asia, where materials and labor are cheaper. However, Storey would not move. He has reportedly said that he would rather quit and go fishing than closeup his factory and move. Bob Storey died in 1980. He was elected into the National Sporting Goods Hall of Fame posthumously in 1982, recognized for his innovation and contributions to the business. In 1989, Hollywood ordered replica vintage Nokonas for the movie Field of Dreams, and later in the film A League of Their Own.

In 1992, a third-generation Storey, Rob, took over Nokona. On July 18, 2006, the 80-year-old factory burned to the ground creating a loss of over $5,000,000. The fire was started by an overheated box fan. The  building burned for eight hours before the fire was extinguished. Factory owners promised to rebuild the plant. Employees sifted through the ashes and salvaged what they could, especially the custom leather cutting dies for the Nokona gloves. The operation moved into an old boot factory in Nocona that had shut down. Ten days after the fire, Nocona Athletic Goods was back in production, and none of their employees lost any wages. The company moved to an old boot factory after the fire, before moving to a permanent location in 2008. In 2017, the boot factory became the new permanent location: including a Nokona retail store, museum, and factory tours.

Showbelts 
In 2018, Nokona pioneered the first custom belt program for Major League Baseball players. These belts are produced at the Nokona Leather Goods factory in Phoenix, AZ, and are available for purchase on the company’s online custom-belt builder. Hundreds of professional players wear Nokona ShowBelts, and they have been featured in special events like the Home run Derby and the All-Star Game. The product name was inspired by MLB players who referred to their custom belts as “showbelts'' because they represent the elite qualities required to make it to “the show.”

Nokona Leather Goods 
Nokona reintroduced a line of leather goods in 2019, called Nokona Leather Goods, harkening back to the origin of the company in 1926. All products are handcrafted in the United States with Nokona’s ballglove leather, with a growing offering that includes wallets, totes, bags, footwear, belts, and outerwear.

Play Catch Movement 
Nokona is a sponsor of the Play Catch Movement, which aims to “improve quality of life through the simple game of catch.” As a leader in the sporting goods industry, Nokona is helping to promote the benefits of playing catch for people of all parts of society, how the “simple act of throwing a ball creates connection between us, confidence within us, and joy among us.”

Professional endorsements 

Past MLB players who have endorsed Nokona include infielder Todd Walker, pitchers Jorge Sosa, Jeff Fulchino and MLB Hall of Fame legend Nolan Ryan. David Ortiz, Miguel Cabrera, Vladimir Guerrero, and Miguel Tejada formerly used Nokona wooden bats.

MLB players 
Major League Baseball players who have used Nokona gloves:

 Max Kranick
 Nick Mears
 Addison Reed
 Steven Brault
 Robby Scott
 Brooks Raley
 Austin Brice
 Tyler Saladino
 Tim Mayza
 Chris Mazza
 Scott Barlow
 Jose Rojas
 Blaine Hardy
 Jake Newberry
 Colten Brewer
 Taylor Ward
 Jerry Vasto
 Jaylin Davis
 Randy Dobnak
 Ben Meyer
 Austen Williams
 Wilmer Font
 Rico Garcia
 Miguel Del Pozo
 Zac Grotz
 Heath Holder
 Jharel Cotton
 Brian O'Grady
 John Nogowski
 David Sosebee
 Tyler Erwin
 Brody Koerner
 JP Feyereisen
 Kirby Bellow
 Matthew Kent
 Danny Woodrow
 Ryan Clark
 Jacob Condra-Bogan
 Kurt Hoekstra
 Sal Mendez
 Jared Robinson
 Argenis Angulo
 Josh Roeder
 Carmen Benedetti
 Hobie Harris
 Tanner Banks
 Jake Haberer
 David Lebron
 Addison Russ
 Graham Lawson
 Laz Rivera
 Levi Stoudt
 Matt Frawley
 Tanner Tully
 Doug Nikhazy
 Sean Mooney
 Brock Whittlesey
 McKinley Moore
 Jojanse Torres
 Joan Adon
 Joe LaSorsa
 Mitchell Tyranski
 Kyle Johnston
 Kyler Stout
 Josh Mitchell
 Michael Helman
 Cole Gordon
 Luis Oviedo
 Derek Craft
 Bryan Warzek
 Jake Sims
 Kyle Martin
 Jake Thompson
 Tim Hardy

References

McLeod, Gerald E. "Daytrips." The Austin Chronicle. 22 February 2002. <http://www.austinchronicle.com/gyrobase/Issue/column?oid=oid%3A84710>.
Satterfield, Michael. "Made in Texas: Nokona Baseball Gloves." The Gentleman Racer. June 24, 2019. <https://www.thegentlemanracer.com/2019/06/made-in-texas-nokona-baseball-gloves.html>.

External links
 
 Nocona at the Nocona Chamber of Commerce Web
 Factory Tours USA article about factory tours

Montague County, Texas
Manufacturing companies established in 1926
Sporting goods manufacturers of the United States
Companies based in Texas
1926 establishments in Texas